Daniel Coburn is a member of the United States Marine Corps. He came to prominence in an incident where he accused his platoon commander, Ilario Pantano, of shooting two unarmed captives while on patrol in Mahmudiyah, Iraq on April 15, 2004. Coburn's accusation was at odds with Pantano's account of events which stated that the shootings were done in self-defence as he was rushed by the insurgent prisoners. Coburn's accusation led to Pantano being charged with murder but was later cleared of any wrongdoing.

April 15th incident
As the platoon approached a compound in Haditha, they saw a vehicle with two Iraqis in it. Pantano ordered his men to stop the vehicle and to have the occupants of the vehicle handcuffed. The vehicle was searched for weapons. Lieutenant Pantano remained with the captives, while the rest of his platoon secured the compound. The compound was deserted, but his men found a cache of arms, including "several mortar aiming stakes, a flare gun, three AK47 rifles, 10 AK magazines with assault vests and IED making material."

When Pantano learned that the compound contained weapons, he ordered Sergeant Daniel Coburn and Corpsman George Gobles to watch for enemies. He then released the captives from their bonds. According to a statement Lieutenant Pantano made to military investigators in June 2004, he then used hand signals to order the captives to search the vehicle again. According to Pantano, during the search of the vehicle he felt the Iraqis posed a threat to him They were talking, and Pantano believed they were conspiring together. When they both turned to face each other, he shouted "Stop!" in both Arabic and English, and when they did not, he shot them. After emptying his magazine, he continued to fire. He later stated: "I then changed magazines and continued to fire until the second magazine was empty...I had made a decision that when I was firing I was going to send a message to these Iraqis and others that when we say, 'No better friend, No worse enemy,' we mean it. I had fired both magazines into the men, hitting them with about 80 percent of my rounds."

Indictment
In June 2004, Sergeant Coburn registered a complaint about the incident, triggering a Naval Criminal Investigative Service probe.

On February 1, 2005, Pantano was charged with two counts of premeditated murder, and faced the death penalty if convicted.

Autopsy report
Prior to Pantano's Article 32 hearing the Department of Defense had maintained that it was impossible to do a post-mortem examination on the corpses of Lieutenant Pantano's captives because they were buried in a cemetery that was in an area that was not under U.S. control. However, shortly before the hearing, bodies were exhumed after all. The autopsy report was released the day after the Article 32 recommendation was made and, according to The Washington Times, supported Lt. Pantano's version of events.

Witnesses
Medical corpsman George Goble was present but did not witness the danger Lieutenant Pantano reported, because he was looking outwards, as ordered. He later stated when he turned back he saw the Iraqis trying to run away.

Sergeant Coburn is reported to have said "As soon as I turned my back, Lt. Pantano opened [fire] with approximately 45 rounds." Coburn, throughout the case, gave five distinctly separate versions of events. Lieutenant Pantano's defense counsels have said they believe that Sergeant Daniel Coburn's account should not be given any credit because he was disgruntled, having been demoted recently due in part to a poor performance evaluation by Pantano.

Another witness, "Corporal 'O' ", was an Arabic-speaking Nigerian-American in Pantano's platoon.  His full name was kept confidential at Pantano's hearing because he is being trained for counter-intelligence duties.

In his testimony at Pantano's hearing, Corporal "O" described interviewing the two captives. He described seeing the vehicle being searched by other Marines, including the removal of its seats. He described seeing the corpses of the captives, following the shooting, face down, with the heads and torsos in the vehicle and their knees resting on the ground, as if Pantano shot the captives in the back while they were kneeling facing the vehicle. Corporal "O" described the sight as "weird".

Sergeant Coburn was heavily criticized for some interviews he had given (he was under a gag order) as well as untruths concerning the evidence in the case.

Coburn's internet statements
The blogosphere also played a major role. Coburn made remarks on Euphoric Reality during the case that were in direct contradiction of his statements to naval investigators. The blog owner turned in the comments to Pantano's attorney, who confronted Coburn on the stand with his own remarks in a dramatic cross-examination that resulted in Coburn being taken off the stand and read his Miranda rights. Coburn returned to the stand three days later after being granted immunity.

Recommendations
Major Winn recommended to Major General Huck, commander of Lieutenant Pantano's division, that the murder charges be dropped. It was his assessment that Sergeant Coburn was an uncredible witness. He did, however, recommend that Pantano receive non-judicial punishment for conduct unbecoming an officer, for the sign he left on the corpses. He described Lieutenant Pantano's treatment of his captive's corpses as a "desecration".  Under U.S. military law, the decision as to whether a court-martial takes place was with General Huck. He decided not to refer the case to a court-martial.

See also

References

Living people
United States Marines
Year of birth missing (living people)